Haworthiopsis fasciata, formerly Haworthia fasciata, is a species of succulent plant from the Eastern Cape Province, South Africa. The species is rare in cultivation; most plants that are labelled as H. fasciata are actually Haworthiopsis attenuata.

Description
 
The plants are generally small, less than 10 cm (4 in) high. The triangular shaped leaves are green with narrow white crested strips on the outside. At the end of the leaf is a non acute spine. The summer flowers appear in October and November, on the end of an inflorescence.

The species has similar markings to Haworthiopsis attenuata, which is commonly grown as a house plant. The two are therefore frequently confused with each other, and a great many H. attenuata specimens are mislabelled as the rarer H. fasciata.

However Haworthiopsis fasciata is rare in cultivation, and can easily be distinguished by the smooth upper (ie. inner) surfaces of its leaves. Its white tubercles occur only on the lower (outer) sides of its leaves; whereas H. attenuata has roughness or tubercles on both sides of its leaves. The leaves of H. fasciata are also often stouter and more deltoid. They tend to curve inwards more. Unlike H. attenuata, older H. fasciata specimens also sometimes develop long columnal stems.

The most fundamental distinction, though not externally obvious, is that Haworthiopsis fasciata has fibrous leaves – unlike H. attenuata, but similar to H. glauca, H. coarctata, H. reinwardtii and H. longiana.

Distribution
This species favours the acidic sands of the fynbos vegetation type, in the area near Port Elizabeth and Uitenhage, in the Eastern Cape, South Africa.

Varieties 
H. fasciata var. fasciata : the type variety
H. fasciata f. browniana : a form with a dark red color
H. fasciata f. patensie : a form with short, keeled, light green & red leaves

References

Flora of the Cape Provinces
fasciata
Garden plants